The Croatia women's junior national handball team is the national under-19 handball team of Croatia. Controlled by the Croatian Handball Federation that is an affiliate of the International Handball Federation IHF and also a part of the European Handball Federation EHF, The team represents the country in international matches.

Tournament record

World Championship
 Champions   Runners up   Third place   Fourth place

European Championship
 Champions   Runners up   Third place   Fourth place

References

External links
Official website

Handball in Croatia
Women's national junior handball teams
h